Arne Dagfin Dahl (24 May 1894 – 26 October 1990) was a Norwegian military officer most renowned as the commander of the Alta Battalion during the fighting at Narvik in  Northern Norway in 1940.

Early and personal life
Born in Kristiania on 24 May 1894, Arne Dagfin Dahl was the son of postmaster Ragnvald Dahl and Anna Othilie Stablum. He was brother of fellow army officer Ørnulf Dahl. He took his examen artium in 1912, graduated from business school in 1919 and entered law studies at the Royal Frederick University in 1921. In 1924, he dropped out of university, to become director of the Norwegian Automobile Federation. Dahl had gained an international pilot licence in 1918.

On 17 September 1921, Dahl married Kristiania-born Astri Thinn Christophersen (b. 12 July 1901). By 1930, the couple had three daughters.

Civilian career
In the years 1920-1924, Dahl worked as a physical education teacher at the school St. Hanshaugens gymnasium. From 1920 to 1924 he worked as a secretary at the Oslo Forsvarsforening, and from 1923 to 1929 he edited the automotive magazine Norsk Motorblad.

Military career

First World War
Dahl graduated from the Norwegian Military Academy in 1915, with the rank of first lieutenant. During the First World War, Dahl first saw service in the Norwegian Army's neutrality guard in 1915-1916, with the 14th Infantry Regiment. He then served as the Norwegian military attaché to the United Kingdom (1916-1919) and Belgium (1917-1919).

In connection with this assignment to Belgium Dahl spent time at the front lines as an observer. According to a report on the Alta Battalion by the Norwegian Ministry of Health and Care Services, Dahl saw action during his time at the front, fighting in a British unit at the Battle of the Somme in 1916.

After returning to Norway in 1919, Dahl spent five years working at the Norwegian Military Academy. In 1929 he became an adjutant to Haakon VII of Norway, and in 1930 was promoted to captain.

Second World War
Dahl assumed command of the Alta Battalion in 1939 and led it through the 1940 Norwegian Campaign. He has since been considered perhaps the best Norwegian battalion commander during the fighting at Narvik.

He later served in the UK and the U.S. as well as having other commands before in the fall of 1944, as a full colonel, he was made commander of the Norwegian Military Mission.

In 1941 Dahl became the first Norwegian to attend the Command and General Staff College at Fort Leavenworth, Kansas.

Finnmark command

Dahl was given charge of the Norwegian forces that were transferred to assist in the Liberation of Finnmark from November 1944. Once there, he assumed control of the front from the Soviets, commanding the Free Norwegian Forces that had followed him from Britain, locally raised militias, and recently arrived police troops from Sweden. At the time of the German capitulation in Norway on 8 May 1945 Dahl had under his Finnmark command around 3,000 soldiers. Although involved in very little fighting, the force under Dahl's command was heavily involved in helping the civilian population of Finnmark and served as a symbol of Norwegian sovereignty in the area. Dahl on his part was concerned that the Russian forces which had been stationed in Eastern Finnmark since the October 1944 Petsamo-Kirkenes Operation might not leave after war's end. These concerns turned out not to come true as all the Soviet forces left Norwegian territory by 25 September 1945.

Post-war service

A.D. Dahl became a Major General and commander of District Command North in 1945.

In the period 1 September 1949 to 31 October 1950, Dahl commanded the Independent Norwegian Brigade Group in Germany.

Honours and awards
By 1930, Dahl was an Officer of the Order of the British Empire and a Knight of the Belgian Order of the Crown.

References

Bibliography

 

1894 births
1990 deaths
Norwegian Military Academy alumni
Academic staff of the Norwegian Military Academy
Non-U.S. alumni of the Command and General Staff College
Norwegian aviators
Norwegian expatriates in Belgium
Norwegian expatriates in France
Norwegian expatriates in the United Kingdom
Norwegian expatriates in the United States
Norwegian Army generals
Norwegian Army personnel of World War II
Norwegian people of World War I
Schoolteachers from Oslo
Norwegian magazine editors
Norwegian military attachés
Burials at Vestre gravlund
Recipients of the Croix de Guerre 1939–1945 (France)
Recipients of the St. Olav's Medal with Oak Branch
Honorary Commanders of the Order of the British Empire
Commandeurs of the Légion d'honneur
Knights of the Order of the Crown (Belgium)